Town Schools Education Initiatives (TSEI), established in 2007 in Delhi, is engaged in school services and vocational and skills training. The Initiative aims to find livelihoods for people while also linking school education with employment and/or higher education. TSEI is registered and authorized by the Director of General Employment & Training as a vocational training provider for the state of Uttar Pradesh, and is also authorized to provide training in the state of Uttrakhand. TSEI has also been commissioned by the government of Uttar Pradesh to set up 480 technical institutions, including 8 engineering colleges and 472 polytechnics and ITI. TSEI was envisioned & promoted by Mr. Om Pathak, a former civil servant, and Mr. Anshul Pathak, a former Citibank treasurer.

References 

Education in Delhi